Eliana Marie Mason (born September 1, 1995) is an American goalball player who competes in international-level events.

References

External links 
 
 

1995 births
Living people
Paralympic goalball players of the United States
Paralympic medalists in goalball
Paralympic bronze medalists for the United States
Goalball players at the 2016 Summer Paralympics
Medalists at the 2016 Summer Paralympics
Medalists at the 2015 Parapan American Games
Medalists at the 2019 Parapan American Games
Sportspeople from Beaverton, Oregon
Goalball players at the 2020 Summer Paralympics